Maximo Junta (born 2 December 1950) is a former Filipino cyclist. He competed in the individual road race and individual pursuit events at the 1972 Summer Olympics.

References

External links
 

1950 births
Living people
Filipino male cyclists
Olympic cyclists of the Philippines
Cyclists at the 1972 Summer Olympics
Place of birth missing (living people)